Norwegian county road 411 (Fv411) is a Norwegian county road in Agder county, Norway. The western end of the road starts at the junction of Norwegian County Road 410 in the town of Tvedestrand in Tvedestrand municipality. It then heads along the coastline until it reaches the junction with Norwegian County Road 416 at Bossvika in Risør municipality.

References

411
Road transport in Agder
Risør